Mohammad Hassannejad (born 6 September 1981) is an Iranian politician.

Hassannejad was born in Jolfa, East Azerbaijan. He is a member of the present Islamic Consultative Assembly from the electorate of Jolfa and Marand. and member of Iran-Turkey Friendship society. Hassannejad won with 50,586 (36.22%) votes. Hassannejad was the youngest member of the parliament in the 9th term.

References

External links
 Mohammad Hassannejad Website

People from East Azerbaijan Province
Deputies of Marand and Jolfa
Living people
1981 births
Members of the 9th Islamic Consultative Assembly
Followers of Wilayat fraction members
Members of the 10th Islamic Consultative Assembly
Academic staff of Shahid Beheshti University
Shahid Beheshti University alumni